These are the Billboard magazine Hot 100 number one hits of 1959.

A total of 15 songs reached number 1 in the year of 1959, while a 16th song, “The Chipmunk Song (Christmas Don't Be Late)", began its number-1 run in December 1958.

That year, 9 acts achieved their first number one, such as Lloyd Price, Frankie Avalon, The Fleetwoods, Dave "Baby" Cortez, Wilbert Harrison, Johnny Horton, The Browns, Santo & Johnny, and Bobby Darin. The Platters, Paul Anka, Elvis Presley, and Guy Mitchell, despite having most of their previous songs hit number one prior to the creation of the Hot 100, also receive their first number one song on the chart. Frankie Avalon and The Fleetwoods were the only acts this year to have two number one songs.

Chart history

Number-one artists

See also
1959 in music

References

Sources
Fred Bronson's Billboard Book of Number 1 Hits, 5th Edition
Joel Whitburn's Top Pop Singles 1955-2008, 12 Edition
Joel Whitburn Presents the Billboard Pop Charts, 1955-1959
Additional information obtained can be verified within Billboard's online archive services and print editions of the magazine.

United States hot 100
1959